Arkhipienka  (Łacinka: Archipienka), is a Belarusian-language version of Ukrainian family name Arkhipenko, of patronymic derivation from the Slavic first name Arkhyp/Arkhip. 

The surname may refer to:
Hanna Arkhipenka, Belarusian pentathlete

Belarusian-language surnames